The Minoan eruption was a catastrophic volcanic eruption that devastated the Aegean island of Thera (also called Santorini) circa 1600 BCE. It destroyed the Minoan settlement at Akrotiri, as well as communities and agricultural areas on nearby islands and the coast of Crete with subsequent earthquakes and tsunamis. Since tephra from the Minoan eruption serves as a marker horizon in nearly all archaeological sites in the Eastern Mediterranean, its precise date is of high importance and has been fiercely debated among archaeologists and volcanologists for decades, without coming to a definite conclusion.

Although there are no clear ancient records of the eruption, its plume and volcanic lightning may have been described in the Egyptian Tempest Stele. The Chinese Bamboo Annals reported unusual yellow skies and summer frost at the beginning of the Shang dynasty, which may have been a consequence of volcanic winter (similar to 1816, the Year Without a Summer, after the 1815 eruption of Mount Tambora).

Eruption

Background

Geological evidence shows the Thera volcano erupted numerous times over several hundred thousand years before the Minoan eruption. In a repeating process, the volcano would violently erupt, then eventually collapse into a roughly circular seawater-filled caldera, with numerous small islands forming the circle. The caldera would slowly refill with magma, building a new volcano, which erupted and then collapsed in an ongoing cyclical process.

Immediately before the Minoan eruption, the walls of the caldera formed a nearly continuous ring of islands, with the only entrance between Thera and the tiny island of Aspronisi. This cataclysmic eruption was centered on a small island just north of the existing island of Nea Kameni in the centre of the then-existing caldera. The northern part of the caldera was refilled by the volcanic ash and lava, then collapsed again.

Magnitude
The magnitude of the eruption, particularly the submarine pyroclastic flows, has been difficult to estimate because the majority of the erupted products were deposited in the sea. Published in 1991, an early estimate of  DRE was given based on directly mapped  DRE ash fallout and an assumed submarine volume of  DRE. The latter assumption is from observations that volume of ash fallout approximates volume of pyroclastic flows in other large eruptions which have direct estimations for.

Research by a team of international scientists in 2006 revealed that the Santorini event could be much larger than the early estimate that was published in 1991. The team used seismic survey to reveal an extensive submarine sediment sequence resembling that of pyroclastic flows. The eruption's Volcanic Explosivity Index was 7.

Without direct sampling of the submarine unit, other researchers are not entirely convinced of this pyroclastic interpretation. Others have pointed out that identification on seismic profiles is problematic because of the many other eruptions and tuffs with which they can be confused, and only drilling will enable to test the published seismic interpretation. New interpretation based on more comprehensive, higher resolution seismic profile and drilled sediment cores indicated that a much smaller volume, approximately  DRE, of submarine sediment can be attributed to Minoan eruption. Together with volume of ash fallout yields a total eruption volume of  DRE, consistent with independently estimated caldera collapse volume , making this an high confidence estimate.

Nonetheless, only the Mount Tambora volcanic eruption of 1815, Mount Samalas eruption of 1257, Lake Taupo's Hatepe eruption around 230 CE, and perhaps the Paektu Mountain eruption of 946 CE, released more material into the atmosphere during historic times.

Sequence
This layer has three distinct bands that indicate the different phases of the eruption. Studies have identified four major eruption phases, and one minor precursory tephra fall. The thinness of the first ash layer, along with the lack of noticeable erosion of that layer by winter rains before the next layer was deposited, indicate that the volcano gave the local population a few months' warning. Since no human remains have been found at the Akrotiri site, this preliminary volcanic activity probably caused the island's population to flee. It is also suggested that several months before the eruption, Santorini experienced one or more earthquakes, which damaged the local settlements.

Archaeological evidence indicated burial of man-made structures with limited damage. The second (BO2/Minoan B) and third (BO3/Minoan C) eruption phases involved pyroclastic surges and lava fountaining, as well as the possible generation of tsunamis. Man-made structures not buried during Minoan A were completely destroyed. The third phase was also characterized by the initiation of caldera collapse. The fourth, and last, major phase (BO4/Minoan D) was marked by varied activity: lithic-rich base surge deposits, lava flows, lahar floods, and co-ignimbrite ash-fall deposits. This phase was characterized by the completion of caldera collapse, which produced megatsunamis.

Geomorphology

Although the fracturing process is not yet known, the altitudinal statistical analysis indicates that the caldera had formed just before the eruption. The area of the island was smaller, and the southern and eastern coastlines appeared regressed. During the eruption, the landscape was covered by the pumice sediments. In some places, the coastline vanished under thick tuff depositions. In others, recent coastlines were extended towards the sea. After the eruption, the geomorphology of the island was characterized by an intense erosional phase during which the pumice was progressively removed from the higher altitudes to the lower ones.

Volcanology
In addition, the magma underlying the volcano came into contact with the shallow marine embayment, resulting in violent phreatomagmatic blasts.

The tsunami affected coastal towns such as Amnisos, where building walls were knocked out of alignment.

Elsewhere in the Mediterranean are pumice deposits that could have been sent by the Thera eruption. Ash layers in cores drilled from the seabed and from lakes in Turkey show that the heaviest ashfall was towards the east and northeast of Santorini. The ash found on Crete is now known to have been from a precursory phase of the eruption, some weeks or months before the main eruptive phases, and it would have had little impact on the island. Santorini ash deposits were at one time claimed to have been found in the Nile delta, but this is now known to be a misidentification.

Eruption dating
The Minoan eruption is an important marker horizon for the Bronze Age chronology of the Eastern Mediterranean realm. It provides a fixed point for aligning the entire chronology of the second millennium BCE in the Aegean, as evidence of the eruption is found throughout the region. Yet, archaeological dating based on typological sequencing and the Egyptian chronology is significantly younger than the radiocarbon age of Minoan eruption, by roughly a century. This massive age discrepancy has resulted a fierce debate about whether there is an upheaval in the archaeological synchronization between the Aegean and Egypt.

Archaeology 
Archaeologists developed the Late Bronze Age chronologies of eastern Mediterranean cultures by analyzing design styles of artifacts found in each archaeological layer. If the type of artifacts can be accurately assigned, then the layer's position in a chronological order can be determined. This is known as sequence dating or seriation. In Aegean chronology, however, frequent exchange of objects and styles enables relative chronology be compared with absolute chronology of Egypt, so absolute dates could be determined in Aegean.

Since Minoan eruption has been conclusively placed the in late/end Late Minoan IA (LM-IA) in the Crete chronology, late/end Late Helladic I (LH-I) in the mainland chronology, the contention is what Egyptian period was contemporaneous with LM-IA and LM-IB. Decades of intensive archaeological work and seriation on Crete in the last century had confidently correlated the late LM-IA with Dynasty XVIII in Egypt and the end of LM-IA at the start of Thutmose III. Stone vessels discovered in the Shaft Graves in LH-I are also of New Kingdom type. Multiple archaeological sites of Theran pumice workshop used by the local inhabitants are only found in the New Kingdom strata. A milk bowl on Santorini used before volcanic eruption has pottery style of only that of New Kingdom. Egyptian inscription on the Ahmose Tempest Stele recorded an extraordinary cataclysm resembling the Minoan eruption. Taken together, the archaeological evidence points to an eruption date after the accession of Ahmose I. The year of accession based on the conventional Egyptian chronology and radiocarbon-based chronology are 1550 BCE and 1570–1544 BCE (IntCal04) or 1569–1548 BCE (IntCal20). The massive archaeological evidence argues for a Theran eruption date between circa 1550–1480 BCE.

Proponents of earlier date dispute that Aegean-Egypt pottery correlation allows considerable flexibility. Several other archaeological interpretations of LM-IA and LM-IB pottery differ from the "traditional" and could be consistent with a much earlier beginning time for LM-IA and LM-IB. Pottery synchronisms was also assessed to be less secure before the LM-IIIAI/Amenhotep III period. Pumice in workshop and inscription on Tempest Stele have been argued to only reflect lower bound of eruption age. The date of production of pottery with Santorini milk bowl style in other regions has not been determined and could pre-date Minoan eruption. The chronology of stone vessel styles during this critical period is lacking.

Radiocarbon age 
Raw radiocarbon dates are not accurate calendar years of the event and this has to do with the fact that the level of atmospheric radiocarbon fluctuates. Raw radiocarbon ages can be converted to calendar dates by means of calibration curves which are periodically updated by international researchers. Derived calibrated calendar date ranges are highly dependent on how accurately calibration curve represents radiocarbon levels for the time period. As of 2022, the most updated calibration curve is IntCal20. Early radiocarbon dates in the 1970s with calibration were already showing massive age disagreement and were initially discarded as unreliable by the archaeological community. In the following decades, the range of possible eruption date narrowed significantly with improved calibration, analytical precision, statistical method and sample treatment. Radiocarbon dating has built a strong case for an eruption date in the late 17th–century BC. The table below summarizes the history and results of radiocarbon dating of volcanic destruction layer with pre–2018 calibration curves:

In 2018, a team led by tree ring scientist reported a possible offset of a few decades in the previous IntCal calibration curves during the period 1660–1540 BCE. The resulted new calibration curve allowed previous raw radiocarbon dates be calibrated to encompass a substantial part of 16th–century BC, making it possible for radiocarbon dates to be compatible with archaeological evidence. The measured offset was then confirmed by other laboratories across the world and incorporated into the most updated calibration curve IntCal20. In the same year, study of bomb peak further questioned the validity of wiggle-matching of olive branch because the radiocarbon dates of outermost branch layer could differ by up to a few decades caused by growth cessation, then the olive branch could also pre-date Thera by decades.

In 2020, speculation of regional offset specific to Mediterranean context in all calibration curves was reported based on measurements made on juniper wood at Gordion. If the regional offset is genuine, then calibration based on the regional dataset, Hd GOR, would place eruption date back to 17th–century. Others have argued that these site-specific offsets are already incorporated into the IntCal20 prediction interval since it is constructed from a much wider range of locations and any locational variation is of similar magnitude to the inter-laboratory variation. 

While the refined calibration curve IntCal20 does not rule out a 17th–century eruption date, it does shift the probable range of eruption date to include the majority of 16th–century BC, offering a way to at least mitigate the long-standing age disagreement. However, the exact year of eruption has not been settled. The table below summarizes the dating results:

Ice cores, tree rings and speleothems 
An eruption of Theran magnitude is expected to leave detectable signal in various environmental records like ice core and tree ring. Petrologic constraints on Minoan magma yields a range of 0.3–35.9 trillion grams of sulfur release. The higher end of the estimate could cause severe climatic change and leave detectable signals in ice cores and tree rings. Notably, tree ring dating allows extremely precise dating to the exact calendar year of each ring with virtually no age uncertainty, and from properties of the annual tree rings local climate record could be reconstructed down to sub-annual precision.

In 1987, a major Greenland sulfate spike in 1644 ± 20 BCE in ice core chronology was hypothesized to be caused by Minoan eruption based on the early radiocarbon results of Hammer et. al. In 1988, a major environmental disruption and extreme global-cooling/forst-ring in 1627 ± 0 BCE were also revealed through precisely dated frost-ring and too were hypothesized to be related to Minoan eruption.

Archaeologists who preferred late 16th–century BC eruption date were neither convinced by the 1644 ± 20 BCE sulfate spike nor by the 1627 BCE frost-ring because evidence of causality between the two events and Minoan eruption was absent. 

Since 2003, multiple independent studies of major elements and trace elements of volcanic ash retrieved from the 1644 ± 20 BCE sulfate layer failed to match the ash to that of Santorini but all attributed the ash to another large eruption during this period, Mount Aniakchak, thus ruling out Minoan eruption as the cause of the sulfate spike. In 2019, revision of Greenland ice core chronology was proposed based on synchronization of frost-ring and major sulfate spike, and the revised date for Aniakchak eruption was shifted to 1628 BCE. The Greenland ice core chronology offset was independently confirmed by other teams and adopted into Greenland Ice Core Chronology 2021 (GICC21). The 1627 BCE extreme global cooling was then conveniently explained by the major Aniakchak eruption without invoking Thera. An eruption date of 1627 BCE is also no longer supported by radiocarbon evidence with the most recent calibration curve IntCal20.

In the light of much younger radiocarbon dates and revised ice core chronology, several possible ice core and tree ring signals in the 17th– and 16th–century have been proposed. The list below summarizes the tree ring and ice core signals that may have been caused by Minoan eruption:

The date of Minoan eruption does not necessarily have to be in one of the years listed in the table, because the eruption may not have been environmentally impactful enough to leave any detectable signal.

In addition, a stalagmite from Turkey shows bromine peaks at 1621 ± 25 BCE, molybdenum at 1617 ± 25 BCE and sulfur at 1589 ± 25 BCE. The authors interpreted that all three peaks were caused by a single volcanic eruption in the Mediterranean region and the time difference was related to differences in their retention rates. Others have suggested that the sulfur peak may have been related to 1561 BCE chemical anomaly recorded in Mediterranean tree ring.

Historical impact

Minoan sites

The eruption devastated the nearby Minoan settlement at Akrotiri on Santorini, which was entombed in a layer of pumice. It is believed that the eruption also severely affected the Minoan population on Crete, but the extent of the impact is debated. Early hypotheses proposed that ashfall from Thera on the eastern half of Crete choked off plant life, causing starvation of the local population. Other hypotheses have been proposed based on archaeological evidence found on Crete indicating that a tsunami, likely associated with the eruption, impacted the coastal areas of Crete and may have devastated the Minoan coastal settlements. Another hypothesis is that much of the damage done to Minoan sites resulted from a large earthquake and the fires it caused, which preceded the Thera eruption.

Significant Minoan remains have been found above the Thera ash layer and tsunami level dating from the Late Minoan I era, and it is unclear whether the effects of the ash and tsunami were enough to trigger the downfall of the Minoan civilization. Some sites were abandoned or settlement systems significantly interrupted in the immediate aftermath of the eruption. Some archaeologists speculate that the eruption caused a crisis in Minoan Crete, opening it to Mycenaean influence or even conquest.

Chinese records
A volcanic winter from an eruption in the late 17th century BCE has been claimed by some researchers to correlate with entries in later Chinese records documenting the collapse of the semi-legendary Xia dynasty in China. According to the Bamboo Annals, the collapse of the dynasty and the rise of the Shang dynasty, approximately dated to 1618 BCE, were accompanied by "yellow fog, a dim sun, then three suns, frost in July, famine, and the withering of all five cereals".

Effect on Egyptian history

Apocalyptic rainstorms, which devastated much of Egypt, and were described on the Tempest Stele of Ahmose I, have been attributed to short-term climatic changes caused by the Theran eruption. The dates and regnal dates of Ahmose I are in some dispute with Egyptologists (leaving aside alternate chronologies). Proposed reigns range from 1570–1546 BC to 1539–1514 BC. A radiocarbon dating of his mummy produced a mean value of 1557 BC. In any case this would only provide an overlap with the later estimates of eruption date.

Alternatively, if the eruption occurred in the Second Intermediate Period, the absence of Egyptian records of the eruption could be caused by the general disorder in Egypt around that time.

While it has been argued that the damage attributed to these storms may have been caused by an earthquake following the Thera eruption, it has also been suggested that it was caused during a war with the Hyksos, and the storm reference is merely a metaphor for chaos upon which the Pharaoh was attempting to impose order. Documents such as Hatshepsut's Speos Artemidos depict storms, but are clearly figurative, not literal. Research indicates that the Speos Artemidos stele is a reference to her overcoming the powers of chaos and darkness.

Greek traditions

The Titanomachy
The eruption of Thera and volcanic fallout may have inspired the myths of the Titanomachy in Hesiod's Theogony. The Titanomachy could have picked up elements of western Anatolian folk memory, as the tale spread westward. Hesiod's lines have been compared with volcanic activity, citing Zeus's thunderbolts as volcanic lightning, the boiling earth and sea as a breach of the magma chamber, immense flame and heat as evidence of phreatic explosions, among many other descriptions.

Atlantis

Spyridon Marinatos, the discoverer of the Akrotiri archaeological site, suggested that the Minoan eruption is reflected in Plato's story of Atlantis.

Book of Exodus
Geologist Barbara J. Sivertsen seeks to establish a link between the eruption of Santorini (c. 1600 BCE) and the Exodus of the Israelites from Egypt in the Bible.

Bicameral mentality
In the controversial bicameral mentality hypothesis, Julian Jaynes has argued that the Minoan eruption was a crucial event in the development of human consciousness since the displacements that it caused led to new and important interactions among communities.

See also
 Timeline of volcanism on Earth
 Chronology of the ancient Near East

References

Further reading
 
 
 
 
Lespez, Laurent, et al., "Discovery of a tsunami deposit from the Bronze Age Santorini eruption at Malia (Crete): impact, chronology, extension", Scientific reports 11.1, 2021
Notti, Erika, "The Theran Epigraphic Corpus of Linear A : Geographical and Chronological Implications", Pasiphae, vol. 000, no. 004, pp. 93-96, 2010
Notti, Erika, "Writing in Late Bronze Age Thera. Further Observations on the Theran Corpus of Linear A", Pasiphae, vol. 000, no. 015, 2021 ISSN: 2037-738X

External links
 Statistical analysis aims to solve Greek volcano mystery - David Nutt - Phys.org - September 20, 2022
 Researchers home in on Thera volcano eruption date - Mikayla MacE Kelley - Phys.org May 2, 2022
 Santorini Decade Volcano – Santorini's geology and volcanic history, the Minoan eruption and the legend of Atlantis.
 The Thera (Santorini) Volcanic Eruption and the Absolute Chronology of the Aegean Bronze Age – A WWW companion site to: Sturt W. Manning, A Test of Time: the volcano of Thera and the chronology and history of the Aegean and east Mediterranean in the mid second millennium BC.
 VolcanoWorld Information about the eruption with photographs
 Thera 2006 Expedition – exploration of the submarine deposits and morphology of Santorini volcano
 The eruption of Santorini in the Late Bronze Age – Online doctoral thesis on the eruption, scientific analyses and its environmental effects (by David A. Sewell, 2001)

16th century BC
17th century BC
2nd-millennium BC natural events
Ancient Aegean Sea
Ancient natural disasters
Ancient Thera
Ancient volcanic events
Events that forced the climate
Landforms of the South Aegean
Landforms of Thira (regional unit)
Megatsunamis
Minoan geography
Plinian eruptions
Tsunamis in Greece
VEI-7 eruptions
Volcanic eruptions in Greece
Volcanic tsunamis